The Lunar Gateway, or simply Gateway, is the first planned extraterrestrial space station in lunar orbit intended to serve as a solar-powered communication hub, science laboratory, and short-term habitation module for government-agency astronauts, as well as a holding area for rovers and other robots. It is a multinational collaborative project involving four of the International Space Station partner agencies: NASA, European Space Agency (ESA), Japan Aerospace Exploration Agency (JAXA), and Canadian Space Agency (CSA). It is planned to be both the first space station beyond low Earth orbit and the first space station to orbit the Moon.

Formerly known as the Deep Space Gateway (DSG), the station was renamed Lunar Orbital Platform-Gateway (LOP-G) in NASA's 2018 proposal for the 2019 United States federal budget. When the budgeting process was complete, US$332 million had been committed by Congress to preliminary studies.

The science disciplines to be studied on the Gateway are expected to include planetary science, astrophysics, Earth observation, heliophysics, fundamental space biology, and human health and performance. Construction is planned to take place in the 2020s. The International Space Exploration Coordination Group (ISECG), which is composed of more than 14 space agencies including all the major ones, has concluded that Gateway systems will be critical method in expanding human presence to the Moon, Mars, and deeper into the Solar System.

The project is expected to play a major role in NASA's Artemis program, after 2024. While the project is led by NASA, the Gateway is meant to be developed, serviced, and utilized in collaboration with the CSA, ESA, JAXA, and commercial partners. It will serve as the staging point for both robotic and crewed exploration of the lunar south pole and is the proposed staging point for NASA's Deep Space Transport concept for transport to Mars.

History

Studies 

An earlier NASA proposal for a cislunar station had been made public in 2012 and was dubbed the Deep Space Habitat. That proposal led to funding in 2015 under the NextSTEP program to study the requirements of deep space habitats. In February 2018, it was announced that the NextSTEP studies and other ISS partner studies would help to guide the capabilities required of the Gateway's habitation modules. The solar electric Power and Propulsion Element (PPE) of the Gateway was originally a part of the now-canceled Asteroid Redirect Mission. On 7 November 2017, NASA asked the global science community to submit concepts for scientific studies that could take advantage of the Deep Space Gateway's location in cislunar space. The Deep Space Gateway Concept Science Workshop was held in Denver, Colorado, from 27 February to 1 March 2018. This three-day conference was a workshop where 196 presentations were given for possible scientific studies that could be advanced through the use of the Gateway.

In 2018, NASA initiated the Revolutionary Aerospace Systems Concepts Academic Linkage (RASC-AL) competition for universities to develop concepts and capabilities for the Gateway. The competitors were asked to employ original engineering and analysis in one of four areas; "Gateway Uncrewed Utilization and Operations", "Gateway-Based Human Lunar Surface Access", "Gateway Logistics as a Science Platform", and "Design of a Gateway-Based Cislunar Tug". Teams of undergraduate and graduate students were asked to submit a response by 17 January 2019 addressing one of these four themes. NASA selected 20 teams to continue developing proposed concepts. Fourteen of the teams presented their projects in person in June 2019 at the RASC-AL Forum in Cocoa Beach, Florida, receiving a US$6,000 stipend to participate in the Forum. The "Lunar Exploration and Access to Polar Regions" from the University of Puerto Rico at Mayagüez was the winning concept.

NASA unveiled the name of the lunar-orbit space station in November 2019, and the Gateway with its name and logo associated with the American frontier symbol of the St. Louis Gateway Arch.

International participants 
On 27 September 2017, an informal joint statement on cooperation regarding the program between NASA and Russia's Roscosmos was announced. However, in October 2020 Dmitry Rogozin, director general of Roscosmos, said that the program is too “U.S.-centric” for Roscosmos to participate in, and in January 2021, Roscosmos announced that it would not participate in the program.

By May 2020, the Canadian Space Agency (CSA), the European Space Agency (ESA) and the Japan Aerospace Exploration Agency (JAXA) all planned to participate in the Gateway project, contributing a robotic arm, refueling and communications hardware, and habitation and research capacity. Those international elements are intended to launch after the initial NASA PPE and HALO elements are placed into lunar orbit.

Power and propulsion 
On 1 November 2017, NASA commissioned five studies lasting four months into affordable ways to develop the Power and Propulsion Element (PPE), leveraging private companies' plans. These studies had a combined budget of US$2.4 million. The companies performing the PPE studies were Boeing, Lockheed Martin, Orbital ATK, Sierra Nevada and Space Systems/Loral. These awards are in addition to the ongoing set of NextSTEP-2 awards made in 2016 to study development and make ground prototypes of habitat modules that could be used on the Gateway as well as other commercial applications, so the Gateway is likely to incorporate components developed under NextSTEP as well. The PPE will use four 6 kW BHT-6000 Busek Hall-effect thrusters and two 12.5 kW NASA/Aerojet Rocketdyne Advanced Electric Propulsion System (AEPS) Hall-effect thrusters for a total engine output fractionally under 50 kW. In 2019, the contract to manufacture the PPE was awarded to Maxar Technologies. After a one-year demonstration period, NASA would then "exercise a contract option to take over control of the spacecraft". Its expected service time is about 15 years.

Orbit and operations 

Traveling to and from cislunar space (lunar orbit) is intended to develop the knowledge and experience necessary to venture beyond the Moon and into deep space. The proposed NRHO would allow lunar expeditions from the Gateway to reach a low polar orbit with a delta-v of 730 m/s and a half a day of transit time. Orbital station-keeping would require less than 10 m/s of delta-v per year, and the orbital inclination could be shifted with a relatively small delta-v expenditure, allowing access to most of the lunar surface. Spacecraft launched from Earth would perform a powered flyby of the Moon (delta-v ≈ 180 m/s) followed by a ≈240 m/s delta-v NRHO insertion burn to dock with the Gateway as it approaches the apoapsis point of its orbit. The total travel time would be 5 days; the return to Earth would be similar in terms of trip duration and delta-v requirement if the spacecraft spends 11 days at the Gateway. The crewed mission duration of 21 days and ≈840 m/s delta-v are limited by the capabilities of the Orion life support and propulsion systems.

One of the advantages of an NRHO is the minimal amount of communications blackout with the Earth.

Gateway will be the first modular space station to be both human-rated, and autonomously operating most of the time in its early years, as well as being the first deep-space station, far from low Earth orbit. This will be enabled by more sophisticated executive control software than on any prior space station, which will monitor and control all systems. The high-level architecture is provided by the Robotics and Intelligence for Human Spaceflight lab at NASA and implemented at NASA facilities. The Gateway could conceivably also support in-situ resource utilization (ISRU) development and testing from lunar and asteroid sources, and would offer the opportunity for a gradual buildup of capabilities for more complex missions over time.

Structure 

For supporting the first crewed mission to the station (Artemis 3) planned for 2025, the Gateway will be a minimalistic mini-space station composed of only two modules: the Power and Propulsion Element (PPE) and the Habitation and Logistics Outpost (HALO). Both PPE and HALO will be assembled on Earth and launched together on a Falcon Heavy in November 2024, and they are expected to reach lunar orbit after nine to ten months. 
The I-Hab module, a contribution from ESA and JAXA, is to be launched on the SLS Block 1B as a co-manifested payload on the Artemis 4 crewed Orion mission. All modules will be connected using the International Docking System Standard.

Planned modules 
  The Power and Propulsion Element (PPE) started development at the Jet Propulsion Laboratory during the now canceled Asteroid Redirect Mission. The original concept was a robotic, high-performance solar electric spacecraft that would retrieve a multi-ton boulder from an asteroid and bring it to lunar orbit for study. When ARM was canceled, the solar electric propulsion was repurposed for the Gateway. The PPE will allow access to the entire lunar surface and act as a space tug for visiting craft. It will also serve as the command and communications center of the Gateway. The PPE is intended to have a mass of 8–9 tons and the capability to generate 50 kW of solar electric power for its ion thrusters, which can be supplemented by chemical propulsion. In May 2019, Maxar Technologies was contracted by NASA to manufacture this module, which will also supply the station with electrical power and is based on Maxar's 1300 series satellite bus. The PPE will use Busek 6 kW Hall-effect thrusters and NASA Advanced Electric Propulsion System (AEPS) Hall-effect thrusters. Maxar was awarded a firm-fixed-price contract of US$375 million to build the PPE. NASA is supplying the PPE with an S-band communications system to provide a radio link with nearby vehicles and a passive docking adapter to receive the Gateway's future utilization module. NASA awarded a contract of US$331.8 million to launch PPE on a SpaceX Falcon Heavy in November 2024 with the HALO module.

  The Habitation and Logistics Outpost (HALO), also called the Minimal Habitation Module (MHM) and formerly known as the Utilization Module, will be built by Northrop Grumman Innovation Systems (NGIS). A single Falcon Heavy will launch HALO in November 2024 along with the PPE module. The HALO is based directly on a Cygnus Cargo resupply module to the outside of which radial docking ports, body mounted radiators (BMRs), batteries and communications antennae will be added. The HALO will be a scaled-down habitation module, yet it will feature a functional pressurized volume providing sufficient command, control and data handling capabilities, energy storage and power distribution, thermal control, communications and tracking capabilities, two axial and up to two radial docking ports, stowage volume, environmental control and life support systems to augment the Orion spacecraft and support a crew of four for at least 30 days. On 5 June 2020, Northrop Grumman Innovation Systems was awarded a contract, by NASA, of US$187 million to complete the preliminary design of HALO. On 9 July 2021, NASA signed a separate contract with Northrop for the fabrication of the HALO, and for integration with the PPE being built by Maxar, for US$935 million. In July 2022, Northrop Grumman awarded Solstar a contract to supply Wi-Fi access for personnel and equipment in the HALO module.

   The European System Providing Refueling, Infrastructure and Telecommunications (ESPRIT) service module will provide additional xenon and hydrazine capacity, additional communications equipment, and an airlock for science packages. ESA has awarded two parallel design studies, one mostly led by Airbus in partnership with Comex and OHB and one led by Thales Alenia Space. The construction of the module was approved in November 2019. On 14 October 2020, Thales Alenia Space announced that they had been selected by the European Space Agency (ESA) to build the ESPRIT module. Early 2021, Thales Alenia Space announced effective contract signature. The ESPRIT module will consist of two parts. The first part, called the Halo Lunar Communication System (HLCS) will provide the communications for the mini-station Gateway. It will launch in November 2024 pre-attached to the HALO module, for which Thales has separately been awarded a contract by NASA to construct its hull and micrometeoroid protection. The second part, called the ESPRIT Refueling Module (ERM), will contain the pressurized fuel tanks, docking ports and small-windowed habitation corridor and launch in 2029.

  The International Habitation Module (I-HAB) will be an additional habitation module built by ESA in collaboration with Japan. Together with the HALO module, they will provide a combined  of habitable volume to the station, after 2024. On 14 October 2020, Thales Alenia Space announced that they had been selected by ESA to build the I-HAB module slated for launch in 2026. The module will also feature contributions from the other station partners, including a life support system from JAXA, avionics and software from NASA and robotics from the Canadian Space Agency (CSA). The module is slated to launch in 2028 on the Artemis 4 mission as a co-manifested payload on the SLS Block 1B along with a crewed Orion spacecraft.

Proposed modules 

The concept for the Gateway is still evolving, and is intended to include the following modules:

  The Gateway Logistics Modules will be used to refuel, resupply and provide logistics on board the mini-space station. The first logistics module sent to the Gateway will also arrive with a robotic arm, which will be built by the Canadian Space Agency (CSA).
  The Gateway Airlock Module will be used for performing extravehicular activities outside the mini-space station and would have the docking port for the proposed Deep Space Transport.
  The Canadarm3, a robotic  remote manipulator arm, similar to the Space Shuttle Canadarm and International Space Station Canadarm2. The arm is to be the contribution of the Canadian Space Agency (CSA) to this international endeavor. CSA contracted MDA (formerly MacDonald, Dettwiler and Associates) to build the arm. MDA previously built Canadarm2, while its former subsidiary, Spar Aerospace, built Canadarm.

Construction 
Crewed flights to the Gateway are expected to use Orion and SLS, while other missions are expected to be done by commercial launch providers. In March 2020, NASA announced SpaceX with its future spacecraft Dragon XL as the first commercial partner to deliver supplies to the Gateway (see GLS).

Phase 1
The first two modules (PPE and HALO) will be launched together on the Falcon Heavy rocket in November 2024.

Criticism 
NASA officials promote the Gateway as a "reusable command module" that could direct activities on the lunar surface. However, the Gateway has received both positive and negative reactions from space professionals.

Michael D. Griffin, a former NASA administrator, said that the Gateway could be useful only after there are facilities on the Moon producing propellant that could be transported to the Gateway. Griffin thinks that after that is achieved, the Gateway would then serve as a fuel depot.

Clive Neal, a University of Notre Dame geologist and advocate for the lunar exploration program, called the Gateway "a waste of money" and stated that NASA is "not fulfilling space policy by building an orbital space station around the Moon".

Former NASA Associate Administrator Doug Cooke wrote in an article on The Hill stating, "NASA can significantly increase speed, simplicity, cost and probability of mission success by deferring Gateway, leveraging SLS, and reducing critical mission operations". He also wrote, "NASA should launch the lander elements (ascent and descent/transfer) on an SLS Block 1B. If an independent transfer element is required, it can be launched on a commercial launcher".

George Abbey, a former director of NASA's Johnson Space Center, said, "The Gateway is, in essence, building a space station to orbit a natural space station, namely the Moon. [...] If we are going to return to the Moon, we should go directly there, not build a space station to orbit it".

Former NASA astronaut Terry W. Virts, who was a pilot of STS-130 aboard  and commander of the ISS on Expedition 43, wrote in an op-ed on Ars Technica that the Gateway would "shackle human exploration, not enable it". He also said, "If we don't have the goal [of Gateway], we are putting the proverbial chicken before the egg by developing "Gemini" before we know what "Apollo" will look like. Regardless of a future destination, as someone who lived on the ISS for 200 days, I cannot envision a new technology that would be developed or validated by building another modular space station. Without a specific goal, we're unlikely to ever identify one". Terry further criticized NASA for abandoning its planned goal of separating crew from cargo, which was put in place following the Space Shuttle Columbia disaster in 2003. Apollo 11 astronaut Buzz Aldrin stated that he is "quite opposed to the Gateway" and that "using the Gateway as a staging area for robotic or human missions to the lunar surface is absurd". Aldrin also questioned the benefit of the idea of sending "a crew to an intermediate point in space, pick up a lander there and go down". Conversely, Aldrin expressed support for Robert Zubrin's Moon Direct concept which involves lunar landers traveling from Earth orbit to the lunar surface and back.

Pei Zhaoyu, deputy director of the Lunar Exploration and Space Program Center of the China National Space Administration (CNSA), concluded that the Gateway would have "low cost-effectiveness". Pei said the Chinese plan is to focus on a national research station on the surface. In July 2019, Pei announced that China was holding discussions with Russia and the ESA on international co-operation and in August 2020 unveiled China's concept; the International Lunar Research Station (ILRS) with co-operation from Russia and tentative agreement from ESA.

Mars Society founder Robert Zubrin called the Gateway "NASA's worst plan yet" in an article in the National Review. He said, "We do not need a lunar-orbiting station to go to the Moon. We do not need such a station to go to Mars. We do not need it to go to near-Earth asteroids. We do not need it to go anywhere. Nor can we accomplish anything in such a station that we cannot do in the Earth-orbiting International Space Station, except to expose human subjects to irradiation – a form of medical research for which a number of Nazi doctors were hanged". Zubrin also stated, "If the goal is to build a Moon base, it should be built on the surface of the Moon. That is where the science is, that is where the shielding material is, and that is where the resources to make propellant and other useful things are to be found".

Retired aerospace engineer Gerald Black wrote in an article on The Space Review stating that the Gateway is "useless for supporting human return to the lunar surface and a lunar base". He added that it was not planned to be used as a rocket fuel depot and that stopping at the Gateway on the way to or from the Moon would serve no useful purpose and cost propellant.

Mark Whittington, a contributor to The Hill newspaper and an author of several space exploration studies, stated in an article that the "lunar orbit project doesn't help us get back to the Moon". Whittington also pointed out that a lunar orbiting space station was not utilized during the Apollo program and that a "reusable lunar lander could be refueled from a depot on the lunar surface and left in a parking orbit between missions without the need for a big, complex space station".

Astrophysicist Ethan Siegel wrote an article in Forbes titled "NASA's Idea For A Space Station In Lunar Orbit Takes Humanity Nowhere". Siegel stated that "Orbiting the Moon represents barely incremental progress; the only scientific "advantages" to being in lunar orbit as opposed to low Earth orbit are twofold: 1. You're outside of the Van Allen belts. 2. You're closer to the lunar surface", reducing the time delay. His final opinion was that the Gateway is "a great way to spend a great deal of money, advancing science and humanity in no appreciable way".

Response from NASA 
On 10 December 2018, NASA Administrator Jim Bridenstine said at a presentation "There are people who say we need to get there, and we need to get there tomorrow", speaking of a crewed mission to the Moon, countering with "What we're doing here at NASA is following Space Policy Directive 1", speaking of the Gateway and following up with "I would argue that we got there in 1969. That race is over, and we won. The time now is to build a sustainable, reusable architecture. [...] The next time we go to the moon, we're going to have American boots on the moon with the American flag on their shoulders, and they're going to be standing side-by-side with our international partners who have never been to the moon before".

Dan Hartman, the program manager for Gateway, on 30 March 2020, told Ars Technica that the benefits of using Gateway are extending the mission duration, buying down risk, providing research capability and the capability to re-use ascent modules.When you go single, I'll say direct mission to the Moon, you're limited on the supplies, either with the Lander or with Orion. With the Gateway, with just with one logistics module, we think we can extend to about twice the mission duration, so 30 days to 60 days. Obviously, the more crew time you have in lunar orbit helps us with research in the human aspects of living in deep space. The more duration we have, certainly that'll help us buy down significant risk with the extreme environments that we're going to be subjecting our crews to. Because we've got to go figure out how to operate in deep space. Obviously we'll demonstrate new hardware and offer that sustainable flexible path for our Lunar Lander system. With the Gateway, the thinking is we'll be able to reuse the ascent modules potentially multiple times. And again, if we can get mission duration beyond the 30 days, it's going to offer us some additional environmental capabilities. We think it's a tremendous risk buy down asset, not only to explore the Moon sustainably, but to prove out some things that we need to do to get to Mars.

See also

References

External links 
 Deep Space Gateway to Open Opportunities for Distant Destinations - NASA Moon to Mars
 First human outpost near the Moon – RussianSpaceWeb page about the Gateway
 History of the Gateway planning

 
2020s in spaceflight
Artemis program
Crewed spacecraft
Joint ventures
Missions to the Moon
NASA programs
NASA space stations
Spacecraft using halo orbits
Proposed space stations